Thompson Gym, built in 1925, was the indoor arena of North Carolina State University until Reynolds Coliseum opened in 1949. The facility hosted mainly basketball games, including the Southern Conference men's basketball tournament from 1933 to 1946. Reynolds Coliseum has since been replaced by PNC Arena.

The building has since been converted to a theater seating 250 people.

It was named for Frank Martin Thompson, an NCSU athlete killed in World War I.

External links
 NC State facilities information: Thompson Theater

Basketball venues in North Carolina
College basketball venues in the United States
NC State Wolfpack basketball venues
Sports venues in Raleigh, North Carolina
Sports venues completed in 1925
1925 establishments in North Carolina